Lisa Funderburke Hoffman (b. Long Island, NY in 1970) is an arts administrator and non-profit Director known for advocating for a bridge between art and science and supporting community engagement in the arts.

Education
In 1994 Hoffman received her Masters of Science from Howard University in Washington, DC where she studied biology. In 1998 she was a National Science Foundation Fellow.

Career
Hoffman was Associate Director of the McColl Center for Art + Innovation, a contemporary art center in Charlotte, NC. While working for the McColl Center, Hoffman pioneered models of artist-led community engagement for Charlotte. Prior to working in the arts at McColl she was Director of the Charlotte Nature Museum and worked at the National Museum of Natural History. She compared scientists to artists because of their ability to look for the unexpected. Hoffman advocated for Environmental Art and Public Art as a catalyst to integrate established communities with new members. She was Curator of Art + Ecology for the Brightwalk project, a sustainable neighborhood development in Charlotte, NC.

In the Summer of 2015 Lisa Hoffman was appointed by President Barack Obama as a member of the National Museum and Library Services Board. In the Summer of 2016 she was appointed the Director of Alliance of Artists Communities, an international network of artist residency programs.

References

Living people
American arts administrators
Women arts administrators
1970 births